This is a list of universities in Iran.

List of universities
Hamedan University of Technology Hamedan University of Technology
Hekmat Private University Qom Province
 Abadan University of Medical Sciences
 Al-Mustafa International University
 Alzahra University
 Amirkabir University of Technology (Tehran Polytechnic)
 Ahvaz Jundishapur University of Medical Sciences
 Comprehensive University of Technology, Tehran
 Damghan University, Damghan
 Hatef Higher Education Institute, Zahedan
 Faran Virtual University, Tehran
 Parsian Virtual University, Tehran
 Lamei Gorgani Institute of Higher Education
 Farabi Institute of Virtual Higher Education
 Farhangian University
 Fasa University
 Fasa University of Medical Sciences, Fasa
 Fatemiye University of Medical Sciences, Qom
 Ferdowsi University of Mashhad, Mashhad
 Mohajer Technical University of Isfahan, Isfahan
 Garmsar University
 Gilan University of Medical Sciences
 Golestan University, Gorgan
 Golestan University of Medical Sciences, Gorgan
 Golpayegan University of Engineering, Golpayegan
 Gonabad University of Medical Sciences, Gonabad
 Tabari Institute of Higher Education
 Gonbad Kavous University, Golestan
 Gorgan University of Agricultural Sciences and Natural Resources, Gorgan
 Gorgan University of Medical Sciences
 Gilan University of Medical Sciences
 Hadith Science College, Tehran
 Hamedan University of Medical Sciences
 Hormozgan University, Bandar Abbas
 Hormozgan University of Medical Sciences, Bandar Abbas
 Ilam University, Ilam
 Medical University of Ilam, Ilam
 Information and Communication Technology Faculty, Tehran
 Industrial Management Institute, main campus Tehran, central campus Isfahan
 Institute for Advanced Studies in Basic Sciences (IASBS), Zanjan
Institute for Higher Education ACECR Khouzestan, Ahvaz 
 Institute for Studies in Theoretical Physics and Mathematics (IPM)
 International Institute of Earthquake Engineering and Seismology
 International University of Chabahar
 International University of Iran, Washington D.C.
 Iran Informatic Institute (U.A.S.T., Tehran)
 Iran Polymer and Petrochemical Institute
 Iran University of Medical Sciences
 Iran University of Science and Technology (IUST)
 University of Science and Culture
 Iraniyan Internet University (Tehran)
 Isfahan University of Art, Isfahan
 Isfahan University of Medical Sciences
 Isfahan University of Technology
 Islamic Azad University
 Islamic Azad University, Abhar
 Islamic Azad University, Ahar Branch
 Islamic Azad University, Ahvaz Branch
 Islamic Azad University, Aliabad Katul
 Islamic Azad University, Arak Branch
 Islamic Azad University, Astara Branch
 Islamic Azad University, Baft
 Islamic Azad University, Bandar Abbas
 Islamic Azad University, Bojnourd Branch
 Islamic Azad University, Bonab
 Islamic Azad University, Bushehr
 Islamic Azad University, Central Tehran Branch
 Islamic Azad University, Damavand Branch
 Islamic Azad University, Darab Branch
 Islamic Azad University, Dezful Branch
 Islamic Azad University, Eghlid Branch
 Islamic Azad University, Estahban Branch
 Islamic Azad University, Falavarjan Branch
 Islamic Azad University, Farahan Branch
 Islamic Azad University, Science and Research Branch, Fars
 Islamic Azad University, Ferdows Branch
 Islamic Azad University, Firuzabad Branch
 Islamic Azad University, Gachsaran Branch
 Islamic Azad University, Garmsar Branch
 Islamic Azad University, Gonabad Branch
 Islamic Azad University, Hamedan Branch
 Islamic Azad University, Islamshahr Branch
 Islamic Azad University, Karaj Branch
 Islamic Azad University, Kazeroon Branch
 Islamic Azad University, Kerman Branch
 Islamic Azad University, Kermanshah Branch
 Islamic Azad University, Khomain Branch
 Islamic Azad University, Khomeyni Shahr Branch
 Islamic Azad University, Isfahan (Khorasgan) Branch
 Islamic Azad University, Khoy Branch
 Islamic Azad University, Larestan Branch
 Islamic Azad University, Mahabad Branch
 Islamic Azad University, Majlesi Branch
 Islamic Azad University, Maku Branch
 Islamic Azad University, Maragheh Branch
 Islamic Azad University, Marvdasht Branch
 Islamic Azad University, Maybod Branch
 Islamic Azad University, Miyaneh Branch
 Islamic Azad University, Naein Branch
 Islamic Azad University, Nishabur Branch
 Islamic Azad University, Noor Branch
 Islamic Azad University, Gorgan Branch
 Islamic Azad University, Mashhad Branch
 Islamic Azad University, Masjed Soleyman Branch
 Islamic Azad University, Najafabad Branch
 Islamic Azad University, Neyriz Branch
 Islamic Azad University, Shahinshahr Branch
 Islamic Azad University, Parand Branch
 Qazvin Islamic Azad University
 Islamic Azad University, Shahr-e-Qods Branch
 Islamic Azad University, Qom Branch
 Islamic Azad University, Quchan Branch
 Islamic Azad University, Region One
 Islamic Azad University Roudehen Branch
 Islamic Azad University, Sabzevar Branch
 Islamic Azad University, Sanandaj Branch
 Islamic Azad University, Sari Branch
 Islamic Azad University, Saveh Branch
 Islamic Azad University, Science and Research Branch, Tehran (Tehran)
 Islamic Azad University, West Tehran Branch
 Islamic Azad University, Sepidan Branch
 Islamic Azad University, Shabestar Branch
 Islamic Azad University, Shahr-e-Rey Branch
 Islamic Azad University, Shahrekord Branch
 Islamic Azad University, Shahreza Branch
 Islamic Azad University, Shahrood Branch
 Islamic Azad University, Shiraz Branch
 Islamic Azad University, Shirvan Branch
 Islamic Azad University, Shoushtar Branch
 Islamic Azad University, Sirjan Branch
 Islamic Azad University, Tabriz Branch
 Islamic Azad University, Tafresh Branch
 Islamic Azad University, Takistan Branch
 Islamic Azad University, Central Tehran Branch
 Islamic Azad University, East Tehran Branch
 Islamic Azad University, Tehran Medical Branch
 Islamic Azad University, North Tehran Branch
 Islamic Azad University, South Tehran Branch
 Islamic Azad University, Urmia Branch
 Islamic Azad University, Varamin Branch
 Islamic Azad University, Yasuj Branch
 Islamic Azad University, Yazd Branch
 Islamic Azad University, Zahedan Branch
 Islamic Azad University, Zanjan Branch
 Islamic Azad University, Zarand Branch
 Jahad Daneshgahi Academic Institute of Ahvaz
 Jahrom University of Medical Sciences, Jahrom
 Jami Institute of Technology, Isfahan
 Kar Higher Education Institute, Qazvin
 K.N. Toosi University of Technology
 Kashan University of Medical Sciences
 Kerman Khaje-Nasir Higher Education Center (K.K.H.E.C.), Kerman
 Kerman University of Medical Sciences
 Kermanshah University of Medical Sciences
 Kermanshah University of Technology, Kermanshah
 Kharazmi University
 Khayyam Institute of Higher Education, Mashhad
 Khorasan Institute of Higher Education, Mashhad
 Khorramshahr University of Nautical Sciences and Technologies, Khorramshahr
 Kish University (Kish Higher Education Institute)
 Kordestan University of Medical Sciences, Sanandaj
 Lorestan University, Khorramabad
 Lorestan University of Medical Sciences, Khorramabad
 Malek-Ashtar University of Technology
 Mashhad University of Medical Sciences
 Mazandaran University of Medical Sciences, Sari
 Mazandaran University of Science and Technology
 Medical University for the Islamic Republic of Iran's Army, Tehran
 Medical University of Ilam
 Meybod University
 Mofid University
 Mohaghegh Ardabili University
 Montazeri Technical College of Mashhad
 NAJA University of Police, Tehran
 Nooretouba Virtual University, Tehran
 Payame Noor University of Mashhad
 Payame Noor University of Karaj
 Payame Noor University of Eshtehard
 Payame Noor University, Shiraz
 Payame Noor University, Tabriz
 Payame Noor University, Tehran
 Payame Noor University, Urmia
 Persian Gulf University
 Petroleum University of Technology
 Power and Water University of Technology, Tehran
 Qazvin University of Medical Sciences
 Qeshm Institute of Higher Education
 Qom Boy's Technical College
 Qom University of Medical Sciences, Qom
 Rafsanjan University of Medical Sciences
 Raja University, Qazvin
 Razi University
 The Research Institute of Hawzeh va Daneshgah
 Sabzevar School of Medical Sciences, Sabzevar
 Sadjad Institute of Higher Education, Mashhad
 Safir Danesh University of Ilam
 Sari Agricultural Sciences and Natural Resources University
 Sahand University of Technology
 School of International Relations (SIR), Tehran
 Semnan University of Medical Sciences, Semnan
 Shahab Danesh University (دانشگاه شهاب دانش)
 Shahed University, Tehran
 Shahed University of Medical Sciences, Tehran
 Shahid Bahonar University of Kerman
 Shahid Beheshti Teacher Training College
 Shahid Beheshti University, Tehran
 Shahid Beheshti University of Medical Sciences
 Shahid Chamran University North Branch of Dezful
 Shahid Chamran University of Ahvaz
 Shahid Rajaee Teacher Training University, Tehran
 Shahid Sadoughi University of Medical Sciences and Health Services
 Shahid Sattari University of Aeronautical Engineering, Tehran
 Shahid Shamsipour Institute of Technology
 Shahrekord University
 Shahrekord University of Medical Sciences
 Shahrood University of Technology
 Shahroud University of Medical Sciences
 Shariaty Technical College, Tehran
 Sharif University of Technology, Tehran
 Sharif University of Technology, International Campus - Kish
 Sheikhbahaee institute of higher education, Isfahan
 Shiraz University, Shiraz
 Shiraz University of Medical Sciences
 Shiraz University of Technology
 Shomal University
 Soore University
 Taali Institute of HigherEducation, Qom (موسسه آموزش عالی تعالی)
 Tabarestan University (Tabarestan Higher Education Institution)
 Tabriz Islamic Art University, Tabriz
 Tabriz University of Medical Sciences
 Tafresh University, Tafresh
 Tarbiat Moallem University (of Arak) 
 Tarbiat Moallem University of Sabzevar, Sabzevar
 Tarbiat Modares University (Professor Training University)
 Tehran University of Medical Sciences
 Technical and Vocational University
 Tehran University of Medical Sciences - International Campus (TUMS-IC)
 Torbat Heydarieh University of Medical Sciences
 University College of Nabi Akram, Tabriz
 University of Applied Science and Technology
 University of Arak
 University of Art, Tehran
 University of Birjand, Birjand
 University of Bonab
 University of Defence Sciences and Technologies, Isfahan
 University of Economic sciences, Tehran
 University of Guilan
 University of Isfahan
 University of Islamic Sects, Tehran
 University of Judicial Sciences and Administrative Services, Tehran
 University of Kashan, Kashan
 University of Kordestan
 University of Mazandaran, Babolsar
 University of Qom
 University of Semnan
 University of Sistan and Baluchestan, Zahedan
 University of Social Welfare and Rehabilitation Sciences, Tehran
 University of Tabriz, Tabriz
 University of Tehran, Tehran
 University of Zabol, Zabol
 University of Yazd
 University of Zanjan
 Urmia University
 Urmia University of Medical Sciences
 Urmia University of Technology
 ValiAsr University of Rafsanjan (Vali-E-Asr), Rafsanjan
 Yasuj University, Yasuj
 Yasuj University of Medical Sciences
 Yazd Institute of Higher Education, ACECR
 Isfahan Institute of Higher Education, ACECR
 Zabol University of Medical Sciences
 Zabol University
 Zahedan University of Medical Sciences, Zahedan
 Zanjan University of Medical Sciences, Zanjan

List of universities by province
These are grouped according to their corresponding province, 31 provinces in all.

Alborz Province
 Kharazmi University, Karaj Campus
 Tehran University of Art
 Alborz University of Medical Sciences
 Islamic Azad University, Karaj Branch
 Islamic Azad University, Hashtgerd Branch
 Payame Noor University Of Karaj
 Payame Noor University Of Hashtgerd
 Payame Noor University Of Eshtehard
 Payame Noor University Of Nazarabad
 Rasam Institute of Higher Education
 Farabi Institute of Higher Education

Ardabil Province
 Ardabil University of Medical Sciences
 Islamic Azad University, Ardabil Branch
 Islamic Azad University, Khalkhal Branch
 Islamic Azad University, Meshkin Shahr Branch
 Mohaghegh Ardabili University

East Azerbaijan

 University of Tabriz
 Azarbaijan University of Tarbiat Moallem
 Islamic Azad University, Tabriz Branch
 Sahand University of Technology
 Tabriz College of Technology
 Tabriz Islamic Art University
 Tabriz University of Medical Sciences
 University College of Mizan
 University College of Nabi Akram
 Sahand University of Technology
 Azarbaijan Shahid Madani University
 University of Maragheh
 University of Bonab
 Islamic Azad University, Ahar Branch
 Islamic Azad University, Bonab Branch
 Islamic Azad University, Ilkhchi Branch
 Islamic Azad University, Maragheh Branch Branch
 Islamic Azad University, Marand Branch Branch
 Islamic Azad University, Miyaneh Branch
 Islamic Azad University, Osku Branch
 Islamic Azad University, Shabestar Branch
 Islamic Azad University, Sofian Branch
 Islamic Azad University, Tabriz Branch
 Payam-e-Nour University of Tabriz
 Tabriz College of Technology
 Tabriz Islamic Arts University
 Tabriz University of Medical Sciences
 University College of Nabi Akram
 University College of Mizan

West Azerbaijan
 Islamic Azad University, Maku Branch
 Islamic Azad University, Miandoab Branch
 Islamic Azad University, Khoy Branch
 Islamic Azad University, Mahabad Branch
 Islamic Azad University, Urmia Branch
 Payame Noor University, Maku
 Payame Noor University, Urmia
 Urmia University
 Urmia University of Medical Sciences
 Urmia University of Technology
 Islamic Azad University, Salmas Branch

Bushehr Province
 Bushehr University of Medical Sciences
 Imam Khamenei Junior Technical College of Bushehr
 Islamic Azad University, Bushehr Branch
 Islamic Azad University, Khark Branch
 Persian Gulf University
 Farhangian University

Chahar Mahaal va Bakhtiari
 Islamic Azad University, Borujen Branch
 Islamic Azad University, Farsan Branch
 Islamic Azad University, Shahrekord Branch
 Shahrekord University
 Shahrekord University of Medical Sciences

Fars

 Shiraz University
 Shiraz University of Medical Sciences
 Shiraz University of Technology
 Islamic Azad University, Shiraz Branch
 Jahrom University
 Jahrom University of Medical Sciences
 Islamic Azad University, Jahrom Branch
 Fasa University
 Fasa University of Medical Sciences
 Bahonar College of Technology and Engineering of Shiraz
 Earm Institute of Higher Education
 Hafez Institute of Higher Education
 Honar Institute of Higher Education
 Islamic Azad University, Science and Research Branch, Fars
 Islamic Azad University, Abadeh Branch
 Islamic Azad University, Arsanjan Branch
 Islamic Azad University, Estahban Branch
 Islamic Azad University, Eghlid Branch
 Islamic Azad University, Fasa Branch
 Islamic Azad University, Firouzabad Branch
 Islamic Azad University, Kazerun Branch
 Islamic Azad University, Larestan Branch
 Islamic Azad University, Marvdasht Branch
 Islamic Azad University, Sepidan Branch
 Pasargad Institute of Higher Education
 Payam Noor University of Shiraz
 Quranic Sciences University of Shiraz
 Shahid Bahonar Technical and Vocational College NO. 1 of Shiraz
 Zand Institute of Higher Education

Gilan
 Deylaman Institute of Higher Education
 Ghadr Institute of Higher Education
 Gilan University of Medical Sciences
 Gilan University of Mofid
 Institute of Higher Education for Academic Jihad of Rasht (موسسه آموزش عالي غيرانتفاعي جهاد دانشگاهي رشت)
 Islamic Azad University, Astara Branch
 Islamic Azad University, Bandar Anzali Branch
 Islamic Azad University, Rasht Branch
 Jaber-Ebn-E-Hayyan
 University of Gilan

Golestan
 Golestan University
 Gonbad Kavous University
 Gorgan University of Agricultural Sciences and Natural Resources
 Golestan University of Medical Sciences, Gorgan
 Lamei Gorgani Institute of Higher Education
 Islamic Azad University, Aliabad Katool Branch
 Islamic Azad University, Azadshahr Branch
 Islamic Azad University, Gorgan Branch

Hamedan
 Bu-Ali Sina University
 Electrical Engineering University
 Hamedan University of Technology
 Islamic Azad University Nahavand Branch
 Islamic Azad University, Hamedan Branch
 Islamic Azad University, Malayer Branch
 Islamic Azad University, Tuyserkan Branch
 University of Malayer
 University of Medical Sciences of Hamedan

Hormozgan
 Bandar Abbas University of Medical Sciences
 Hormozgan University
 Islamic Azad University, Bandar Abbas Branch
 Kish University
 Qeshm Institute of Higher Education

Ilam
 Ilam University
 Islamic Azad University, Ilam Branch
 Medical University of Ilam
 Safir Danesh University of Ilam

Isfahan

 Jihad Daneshgahi Institute of Higher Education (ACECR)
 Allameh Feiz Kashani Institute of Higher Education
 Ashrafi Isfahani Institute of Higher Education
 Daneshpazhoohan Institute of Higher Education (موسسه آموزش عالی دانش‌پژوهان)
 Golpayegan University of Engineering
 Isfahan University of Art
 Isfahan University of Medical Sciences
 Isfahan University of Social Welfare and Rehabilitation Sciences
 Isfahan University of Technology (دانشگاه صنعتی اصفهان)
 Mohajer Technical University of Isfahan (MTU) (دانشکده فنی مهاجر اصفهان)
 Islamic Azad University, Najafabad Branch (دانشگاه آزاد اسلامی واحد نجف‌آباد)
 Islamic Azad University, Felavarjan Branch
 Islamic Azad University, Golpayegan Branch
 Islamic Azad University, Isfahan (Khorasgan) Branch(دانشگاه آزاد اسلامی واحد اصفهان خوراسگان)
 Islamic Azad University, Kashan Branch (دانشگاه آزاد اسلامی واحد كاشان)
 Islamic Azad University, Khomeyni Shahr Branch
 Islamic Azad University, Majlesi Branch
 Islamic Azad University, Maymeh Branch
 Islamic Azad University, Mobarakeh Branch
 Islamic Azad University, Naeen Branch
 Islamic Azad University, Shahreza Branch
 Jami Institute of Technology
 Kashan Shahid Rajaee Technical College of T.V.U
 Kashan University of Medical Sciences
 Malek-Ashtar University of Technology
 Ragheb Isfahani Higher Education Institute (موسسه آموزش عالی راغب اصفهانی)
  Shahreza Higher Education Center (مرکز آموزش عالی شهرضا)
 Sheikhbahaee University  (دانشگاه شیخ بهایی)
 University of Defence Sciences and Technologies
 University of Isfahan (دانشگاه اصفهان)
 University of Kashan

Kerman
 Besat Institute of Higher Education of Kerman
 Islamic Azad University, Anar Branch
 Islamic Azad University, Baft Branch
 Islamic Azad University, Bam Branch
 Islamic Azad University, Bardsir Branch
 Islamic Azad University, Jiroft Branch
 Islamic Azad University, Kerman Branch
 Islamic Azad University, Rafsanjan Branch
 Islamic Azad University, Shahr Babak Branch
 Islamic Azad University, Zarand Branch
 Jiroft University
 Kerman Khaje-Nasir Higher Education Center
 Kerman Institute of High Education
 Kerman University of Medical Sciences
 Rafsanjan University of Medical Sciences
 Rafsanjan University of Vali Asr
 Sirjan University of Technology
 Shahid Bahonar University of Kerman
 Shahid Chamran Technical and Vocational College of Kerman

Kermanshah
 Islamic Azad University, Kermanshah Branch
 Kermanshah University of Medical Sciences
 Kermanshah University of Technology
 Razi University
 Jahad Daneshgahi of Kermanshah

Khorasan, North
 Hakiman Institute of Human Science
 Esfarayen University of Technology 
 Islamic Azad University, Bojnourd Branch
 Islamic Azad University, Shiravan Branch
 University of Bojnord

Khorasan, Razavi

 Bahar Institute of Higher Education
 Eqbal Lahoori Institute of Higher Education
 Ferdowsi University of Mashhad
 Gonabad University of Medical Sciences
 Imam Reza University
 Iranian Academic Center for Education, Culture and Research, Mashhad Branch (Jahad Daneshgahi of Mashhad)
 Islamic Azad University, Gonabad Branch
 Islamic Azad University, Mashhad Branch
 Islamic Azad University, Neishabur Branch
 Islamic Azad University, Quchan Branch
 Islamic Azad University, Sabzevar Branch
 Islamic Azad University, Torbat e Jam
 Islamic Azad University, Torbat Heidariyeh Branch
 Khavaran Institute of Higher Education
 Khayyam Institute of Higher Education
 Khorasan Institute of Higher Education
 Mashhad University of Medical Sciences
 Montazeri Technical College of Mashhad
 Quchan University of Advanced Technologies Engineering
 Sabzevar Teacher Training University
 Sabzevar University of Medical Sciences
Sabzevar University of New Technology
 Sadjad Institute of Higher Education
 Salman Institute of Higher Education
 Torbat Heydarieh University of Medical Sciences
 University of Torbat Heydarieh
 University of Neyshabur

Khorasan, South
 Birjand University of Medical Sciences
 Birjand University of Technology
 Islamic Azad University, Birjand Branch
 Islamic Azad University, Ferdows Branch
 University of Birjand

Khuzestan
 Abadan University of Medical Sciences
 Ahvaz Jundishapur University of Medical Sciences
 Ahvaz Payam Noor University
 Islamic Azad University, Abadan Branch
 Islamic Azad University, Ahvaz Branch
 Islamic Azad University, Behbahan Branch
 Islamic Azad University, Dezful Branch
 Islamic Azad University, Izeh Branch
 Islamic Azad University, Masjed Soleyman Branch
 Islamic Azad University, Omidieh Branch
 Islamic Azad University, Shoushtar Branch
 Islamic Azad University - Science & Research Branch, Khuzestan
 Institute for Higher Education ACECR Khouzestan
 Jahad Danshgahi Academic Institute Of Ahvaz
 Jundishapor University of Dezful
 Khorramshahr University of Natural Sciences and Technologies
 Persian Gulf International Education Center
 Petroleum University of Technology
 Shahid Chamran University of Ahvaz
Rahnama Institute of Higher Education
Payame Noor University of Ahvaz
Amiralmoemenin University

Kohkiluyeh va Buyer Ahmad
 Kohgiluyeh and Boyer-Ahmad University of Medical Sciences
 Islamic Azad University, Gachsaran Branch
 University of Yasuj
 Yasuj University of Medical Sciences

Kurdistan
 Farhangian University of Sanandaj
 Islamic Azad University, Sanandaj Branch
 Kurdistan University of Medical Sciences
 Payam Noor University of Bijar Garrus
 University of Kurdistan (external link)

Lorestan
 Grand Ayatollah Borujerdi University, University of Ayatollah ozma Boroujerdi
 Islamic Azad University, Aligudarz Branch
 Islamic Azad University, Borujerd Branch
 Islamic Azad University, Khorramabad Branch
 Lorestan University
 Lorestan University of Medical Sciences
 Shahid Madani Technical and Vocational College

Markazi
 AmirKabir University of Technical Works (Amouzesh Ali Fani)
 Arak University
 Arak University of Medical Sciences
 Iran University of Science and Technology (Arak Campus)
 Islamic Azad University, Arak Branch
 Islamic Azad University, Ashtian Branch
 Islamic Azad University, Farahan Branch
 Islamic Azad University, Khomein Branch
 Islamic Azad University, Saveh Branch
 Islamic Azad University, Tafresh Branch
 Tafresh University, Tafresh
 Tarbiat Moallem University of Arak

Mazandaran
 farvardin institute of higher education (موسسه آموزش عالی فروردین قائمشهر)
 Allame Mohaddes Noori University (دانشگاه علامه محدث نوری)
 Babol Noshirvani University of Technology (دانشگاه صنعتی نوشیروانی بابل)
 Babol University of Medical Sciences
 Behshahr University of Science and Technology
 Imam Khomeini University for Naval Sciences
 Islamic Azad University, Amol Branch
 Islamic Azad University, Babol Branch
 Islamic Azad University, Behshahr Branch
 Islamic Azad University, Nour Branch (دانشگاه آزاد اسلامي واحد نور)
 Islamic Azad University, Sari Branch (دانشگاه آزاد ساری)
 Islamic Azad University, Tonekabon Branch
 Khazar University (دانشگاه خزر)
 Mazandaran University of Medical Sciences
 Mazandaran University of Science and Technology (دانشگاه علوم و فنون مازندران)
 Maziar University (دانشگاه مازیار - نور)
 Shomal University (دانشگاه شمال - آمل)
 Sari Agricultural Sciences and Natural Resources University
 Tabarestan University (Tabarestan Higher Education Institution) (دانشگاه طبرستان)
 University of Mazandaran (دانشگاه مازندران)

Qazvin
 Alvand Payam Noor University
 Kar higher education institute
 Alborz Institute of Higher Education
 Imam Khomeini International University
 Islamic Azad University, Takestan Branch
 Islamic Kar University
 Qazvin Islamic Azad University
 Qazvin University of Medical Sciences
 Raja University, Qazvin 
 Shahid Babaee Technical Institute
 Sohrevardi Institute of Higher Education (موسسه آموزش عالی سهروردی قزوین)k
 Alvand Payam Noor University
  Takestan Institute of Higher Education, Qazvin

Qom
 Al-Mustafa International University
Hekmat Private University
  Qom Payame Noor University
 Computer Research Center of Islamic Sciences, Qom
 Fatemieh University of Medical Sciences
 Imam Khomeini Education and Research Institute
 Islamic Azad University, Qom Branch
 Mofid University
 Shahab Danesh Institute of higher education (موسسه آموزش عالی شهاب دانش)
 Taali Institute of Higher Education, Qom (موسسه آموزش عالی تعالی)
 University of Religions and Denominations
 Qom Boy's Technical College
 University of Qom
 Qom University of Medical Sciences
 Qom University of Technology
 The Research Institute of Hawzeh va Daneshgah

Semnan
 Damghan University
 Eyvanekey University
 Garmsar University
 Islamic Azad University, Garmsar Branch
 Islamic Azad University, Semnan Branch
 Islamic Azad University, Shahrood Branch
 Semnan University of Medical Sciences
 Shahroud University of Medical Sciences
 Shahrood University of Technology
 University of Semnan

Sistan And Baluchistan
 Hatef Institute of Higher Education, Zahedan
 International University of Chabahar
 Islamic Azad University, Iranshahr Branch
 Islamic Azad University, Zahedan Branch
 University of Chabahar
 University of Sistan and Baluchestan
 Zabol University
  Zabol University of Medical Sciences (دانشگاه علوم پزشکی زابل)
 Zahedan University of Medical Sciences

Tehran
See also detailed list of: List of universities in Tehran Province.

 Enghelab-e Eslami Technical College
 Abbaspour University of Technology
 Alborz University of Information & Communication of Technology
 Allameh Tabatabaii University
 Alzahra University
 Amirkabir University of Technology (Tehran Polytechnic)
 Art University of Tehran (دانشگاه هنر تهران)
 Aviation Industry Training Center - AITC
 Bagher Aloloum University
 Baqiyatallah Medical Sciences University
 Civil Aviation Technology College
 Comprehensive University of Technology
 Computer College of National Organization of Educational Testing
 DPI College (ex IBM college)
 Farabi Institute of Virtual Higher Education
 Hadith College of Tehran
 Higher Education Center for Cultural Heritage
 Imam Ali University for Army Officers
 Imam Hossein University
 Imam Sadeq University (ISU)
 International University of Iran
 Institute for Studies in Theoretical Physics and Mathematics (IPM)
 Iran Broadcasting University
 Iran College of Tele-communications
 Iran Polymer and Petrochemical Institute
 Iran University Science and Culture University
 Iran University of Medical Sciences
 Iran University of Science and Technology
 Iranian Business School
 Islamic Azad University, Damavand Branch
 Islamic Azad University, Islamshahr
 Islamic Azad University, Parand Branch
 Islamic Azad University, Roodehen Branch
 Islamic Azad University, Shahr-e-Qods Branch
 Islamic Azad University, Central Tehran Branch
 Islamic Azad University, Tehran Dental Branch
 Islamic Azad University, East Tehran Branch
 Islamic Azad University, West Tehran Branch
 Islamic Azad University, Tehran Medical Branch
 Islamic Azad University, North Tehran Branch
 Islamic Azad University, Region one
 Islamic Azad University, Shahr-e-Rey Branch
 Islamic Azad University, South Tehran Branch
 Islamic Azad University, Varamin Branch
 Islamic Azad University Science and Research Branch
 Jahad Daneshgahi University
 Kharazmi University
 K.N.Toosi University of Technology
 Malek-e-ashtar University of Technology
 Medical University for the Islamic Republic of Iran's Army
 NAJA University of Police
 Nooretouba Virtual University, Tehran
 Payame Noor University
 Power and Water University of Technology
 School of International Relations (SIR)
 Shahed University
 Shahed University of Medical Sciences
 Shahid Beheshti University
 Shahid Beheshti University of Medical Sciences
 Shahid Rajaee Teacher Training University
 Shahid Sattari University of Aeronautical Engineering
 Shahid Shamsipour Institute of Technology
 Shariaty Technical College
 Sharif University of Technology
 Sharif University of Technology (International Campus - Kish)
 Soore University
 Tarbiat Modarres University (Professor Training University)
 Tehran College of Environment
 Tehran University of Medical Sciences
 Tehran University of Medical Sciences, International Campus
 University of Economic Sciences
 University of Emam Reza

Parsian Virtual University, Tehran

 University of Ershad Damavand
 University of Islamic Sects
 University of Science and Culture (دانشگاه علم و فرهنگ)
 University of Social Welfare and Rehabilitation Sciences
 University of Tehran
  Valiasr Technical University

Yazd
 Islamic Azad University, Maybod Branch
 Islamic Azad University, Yazd Branch
 Jahad Daneshgahi of Yazd (JDU)
 Meybod University
 Paknezhad Tarbiat Moslem University of Yazd (دانشگاه تربیت معلم شهید پاکنژاد)
 Shahid Sadoughi
 Yazd University

Zanjan
 Institute for Advanced Studies in Basic Sciences (IASBS)
 Islamic Azad University, Abhar Branch
 Islamic Azad University, Zanjan Branch
 Zanjan University
 Zanjan University of Medical Sciences

See also

 Academy of Gundishapur
 Darolfonoon
 Education in Iran
 Higher education in Iran
 International rankings of Iran
 List of colleges and universities
 List of colleges and universities by country
 List of Iranian Research Centers
 List of Iranian scientists and scholars from the pre-modern era
 List of contemporary Iranian scientists, scholars, and engineers
 List of Iranian medical schools
 List of universities in Tehran Province
 List of colleges and universities in Tehran
 National Library of Iran
 Nizamiyyah

References

External links
 EducationIRAN
 Ministry of Sciences, Research and Technology Of Iran Official Website
 Ministry of Health and Medical Education Of Iran Official Website

Science and technology in Iran
 
Iran
Iran